Edward Heath of the Conservative Party formed the Heath ministry and was appointed Prime Minister of the United Kingdom by Queen Elizabeth II on 19 June 1970, following the 18 June general election. Heath's ministry ended after the February 1974 general election, which produced a hung parliament, leading to the formation of a minority government by Harold Wilson of the Labour Party.

Heath had been elected leader of the Conservative Party in 1965 to succeed Alec Douglas-Home, within a few months of the party's election defeat after 13 years in government. His first general election as leader the following year ended in defeat as Wilson's Labour government increased its majority. The Conservatives enjoyed a surge in support over the next two years as the British economy went through a period of fluctuation with growth and contraction. Unemployment rose significantly, but when Harold Wilson called a general election for June 1970, the opinion polls all pointed towards a third successive Labour victory.

It was a major surprise when the Conservatives won with a majority of 30 seats.

Heath's government initially enjoyed a strong economy and relatively low unemployment, and on 1 January 1973 the United Kingdom became a member state of the European Communities, principally the European Economic Community. But then came the 1973 oil crisis, and just before Christmas, Heath declared a three day week in which the use of offices, factories and most public buildings was reduced to three days a week. He also faced a battle with the unions over pay freezes and restraints, which sparked a rise in strikes. The economy also entered a recession.

Heath's response in February 1974 was to call a general election, urging the voters to decide whether it was the government or the unions which ran Britain. The election on 28 February 1974 resulted in a hung parliament, in which the Conservatives had the most votes but Labour had the most seats. After talks with the Liberals about forming a coalition government failed, Labour formed a minority government on 4 March. A second general election was widely anticipated later in 1974, and was called by Harold Wilson for 10 October, in which the Labour Party gained a three-seat majority. This meant that Wilson had now won four of the five general elections he had contested, while Heath had now lost three of his four general elections, and it seemed inevitable that his leadership would soon end.

Cabinet

June 1970 – March 1974

The cabinet appointed in June 1970 comprised the following:
Prime Minister: Edward Heath
Lord High Chancellor of Great Britain: The Lord Hailsham of St Marylebone
Leader of the House of Commons and Lord President of the Council: William Whitelaw
Leader of the House of Lords and Lord Keeper of the Privy Seal: The Earl Jellicoe
Chancellor of the Exchequer: Iain Macleod
Secretary of State for Foreign and Commonwealth Affairs: Sir Alec Douglas-Home
Secretary of State for the Home Department: Reginald Maudling
Minister of Agriculture, Fisheries and Food: James Prior
Secretary of State for Defence: The Lord Carrington
Secretary of State for Education and Science: Margaret Thatcher
Secretary of State for Employment: Robert Carr
Minister of Housing and Local Government: Peter Walker
Secretary of State for Health and Social Services: Sir Keith Joseph
Chancellor of the Duchy of Lancaster: Anthony Barber
Secretary of State for Scotland: Gordon Campbell
Minister for Technology: Geoffrey Rippon
President of the Board of Trade: Michael Noble
Secretary of State for Wales: Peter Thomas

Changes
July 1970 – Iain Macleod dies, and is succeeded as Chancellor by Anthony Barber. Geoffrey Rippon succeeds Barber as Chancellor of the Duchy of Lancaster. John Davies succeeds Rippon as Secretary for Technology.
October 1970 – The Ministry of Technology and the Board of Trade are merged to become the Department of Trade and Industry. John Davies becomes Secretary of State for Trade and Industry. Michael Noble leaves the cabinet. The Ministry of Housing and Local Government is succeeded by the new department of the Environment which was headed by Peter Walker.
March 1972 – Robert Carr succeeds William Whitelaw as Lord President and Leader of the House of Commons. Maurice Macmillan succeeds Carr as Secretary for Employment. Whitelaw becomes Secretary of State for Northern Ireland.
July 1972 – Robert Carr succeeds Reginald Maudling as Home Secretary. James Prior succeeds Robert Carr as Lord President and Leader of the House of Commons. Joseph Godber succeeds Prior as Secretary for Agriculture.
November 1972 – Geoffrey Rippon succeeds Peter Walker as Secretary for the Environment. John Davies succeeds Rippon as Chancellor of the Duchy of Lancaster. Peter Walker succeeds Davies as Secretary for Trade and Industry. Geoffrey Howe becomes Minister for Trade and Consumer Affairs with a seat in the cabinet.
June 1973 – The Lord Windlesham succeeds Lord Jellicoe as Lord Privy Seal and Leader of the House of Lords.
December 1973 – William Whitelaw succeeds Maurice Macmillan as Secretary for Employment. Francis Pym succeeds Whitelaw as Secretary for Northern Ireland. Macmillan becomes Paymaster-General.
January 1974 – Ian Gilmour succeeds Lord Carrington as Secretary for Defence; Lord Carrington becomes Secretary of State for Energy.

List of ministers
Cabinet members are in bold face.

References
Notes

Sources

External links

British ministries
Government
1970s in the United Kingdom
1970 establishments in the United Kingdom
1974 disestablishments in the United Kingdom
Ministries of Elizabeth II
Cabinets established in 1970
Cabinets disestablished in 1974
Ministry